Morgan Harper Nichols is the first studio album by Morgan Harper Nichols. Gotee Records released the album on May 19, 2015.

Critical reception

Matt Conner, awarding the album three stars at CCM Magazine, says, "Nichols can stand tall on her own." Giving the album four stars from 365 Days of Inspiring Media, Joshua Andre writes, "Morgan Harper Nichols deserves plenty of listens". Laura Chambers, rating the album a 3.6 out of five for Christian Music Review, states, "Morgan Harper Nichol' faith sparkles all over this album, whether shown by her desire for nearness to God or her decisions to trust Him with her future, heart, and steps." Reviewing the album at Soul-Audio, Andrew Greenhalgh says, "Nichols showcases a powerful voice, strong songwriting, and a sound that’s bound to be a hit at radio and more."

Track listing

References

2015 debut albums
Gotee Records albums